Andrew Mark McAvin (born January 4, 1952) is an American voice actor with nearly 80 credits to his resume. He also appeared in over 120 professional theatrical productions including Broadway musicals. He does voice work in anime dubs for ADV Films and Seraphim Digital.

One of his most prominent roles was the genocidal villain Brian J. Mason in Bubblegum Crisis Tokyo 2040, the voice type of which is referred to by cast and crew-mates as the "slime that walks like a man" voice. He also did voice work for the AD Police: To Serve and Protect spin off and for Gamera 3: Revenge of Iris.

McAvin is also an instructor in powered paragliding, logging "over 4000 flights and several thousand hours" and has trained over 300 graduates. He is featured in a documentary called Into the Wind: The Sport of Powered Paragliding.

Filmography

Anime voice roles
 Angelic Layer - Ichiro "Icchan" Mihara
 Area 88 - McCoy
 Azumanga Daioh - Kimura
 BASToF Syndrome - Mayor Hadim
 Broken Blade - Elekt
 Bubblegum Crisis Tokyo 2040 - Brian J. Mason
 Canaan - Cummings
 Chrono Crusade - Aion
 Cromartie High School - Akira Maeda
 Crying Freeman - Nicolaiv (ADV Dub)
 D.N.Angel - Kosuke Niwa
 Demon King Daimao - Peter Hausen
 E's Otherwise - Ghibelline
 Elfen Lied - Director Kakuzawa
 Full Metal Panic! - Richard Mardukas
 Gilgamesh - The Manager
 Horizon in the Middle of Nowhere - Motonobu Matsudaira
 Le Chevalier D'Eon - The Duke of Broglie
 Legend of the Mystical Ninja - Tsukasa's Father
 Loups=Garous - Riichiro Ishida
 Madlax - Eric Gillian
 Master of Mosquiton - Count Sangermaine
 Mardock Scramble - Oeufcoque Penteano
 Martian Successor Nadesico - Vice Admiral Hiroki Kusakabi
 Megazone 23 - BD
 Mezzo DSA - Kenichi Kurokawa
 Najica Blitz Tactics - Gento Kuraku
 Nerima Daikon Brothers - Prime Minister Oizumi
 Orphen - McGregor
 Pani Poni Dash! - Old Geezer
 Panyo Panyo Di Gi Charat - Deji Devil
 The Place Promised in Our Early Days - Tomizawa
 Princess Nine - Shinsaku Kido
 Princess Resurrection - Master
 RahXephon - Johji Futagami
 Saint Seiya - Narrator (ADV Dub)
 Saiyuki: Requiem - Go Dougan
 Science Ninja Team Gatchaman - Dr. Kozaburo Nambu (ADV dub)
 Short Peace - GONK-18 (A Farewell to Weapons), Shika's Husband (Gambo), Tsurunosuke (Combustible)
 Sin: The Movie - Vincenzo Manchini
 Slayers Great - Huey
 Spriggan - Jean Jacques Mondo
 Steel Angel Kurumi - Dr. Walski
 The Super Dimension Fortress Macross - Exedol Folmo
 Tactics - Imposter Goblin, Numata
 Those Who Hunt Elves - Salary Man Santa 2, The Mayor of Treetown
 A Tree of Palme - Fou
 Un-Go - Kichitarou Mitaka (Ep. 7)
 Utawarerumono - Chikinaro
 Vampire Hunter D - Rei-Ginsei, D's Left Hand (Sentai dub)
 Wandaba Style - Kōsaku Tsukomo
 Xam'd Lost Memories - Kanba
 Xenosaga: The Animation - Margulis

Non-anime voice roles
 My Beautiful Girl, Mari - Beard Man
 Halo Legends - Captain (The Package), The Boatman (The Duel)
 Lady Death - Pagan

Documentaries
 Into the Wind: The Sport of Powered Paragliding (2005 film by Chris Page) - Himself (Featured)

References

External links
 
 
  - Andy's PPG company

Living people
1952 births
American male voice actors